or  is the Sumerian name of a prominent trading partner of Sumer during the Middle Bronze Age. Its identification remains an open question, but most scholars associate it with the Indus Valley civilisation.

Etymology

Asko Parpola identifies Proto-Dravidians with the Indus Valley civilization (IVC) and the Meluhha people mentioned in Sumerian records. According to him, the word "Meluhha" derives from the Dravidian words mel-akam ("highland country"). It is possible that the IVC people exported sesame oil to Mesopotamia, where it was known as ilu in Sumerian and eḷḷu in Akkadian. One theory is that these words derive from the South Dravidian I name for sesame (eḷḷ  or eḷḷu). However, Michael Witzel, who associates IVC with the ancestors of Munda speakers, suggests an alternative etymology from the para-Munda word for wild sesame: jar-tila. Munda is an Austroasiatic language, and forms a substratum (including loanwords) in Dravidian languages.

Asko Parpola relates Meluhha with Mleccha who were considered non-Vedic "barbarians" in Vedic Sanskrit.

Trade with Sumer

Sumerian texts repeatedly refer to three important centers with which they traded: Magan, Dilmun, and Meluhha. The Sumerian location of Magan is now accepted to be the area currently encompassing the United Arab Emirates and Oman. Dilmun was a Persian Gulf civilization which traded with Mesopotamian civilizations, the current scholarly consensus is that Dilmun encompassed Bahrain, Failaka Island and the adjacent coast of Eastern Arabia in the Persian Gulf.

Inscriptions

In an inscription, Sargon of Akkad (2334–2279 BCE) referred to ships coming from Meluhha, Magan and Dilmun. His grandson Naram-Sin (2254–2218 BCE) listing the rebel kings to his rule, mentioned "(..)ibra, man of Melukha". In an inscription, Gudea of Lagash referred to the Meluhhans who came to Sumer to sell gold dust, carnelian, etc. In the Gudea cylinders, Gudea mentions that:

In cylinder B, XIV, he mentions his procurement of "blocks of lapis lazuli and bright carnelian from Meluhha".

Meluhha is also mentioned in mythological legends such as Enki and Ninhursag:

There are no known mentions of Meluhha after 1760 BCE.

"Meluhha dog"

In one of his inscriptions, Ibbi-Sin mentions that he received as a booty from Marhasi a Meluhha red dog:

It is thought that this "red dog" could be a dhole, also called "Asiatic red dog", a type of red-colored dog native to southern and eastern Asia.

Meluhhan trading colony in Sumer
Towards the end of the Sumerian period, there are numerous mentions in inscriptions of a Meluhha settlement in southern Sumer near the city-state of Girsu. Most of the references seem to date to the Akkadian Empire and especially the Ur III period. The location of the settlement has been tentatively identified with the city of Guabba. The  references to "large boats" in Guabba suggests that it may have functioned as a trading colony which initially had direct contact with Meluhha.

It seems that direct trade with Meluhha subsided during the Ur III period, and was replaced by trade with Dilmun, possibly corresponding to the end of urban systems in the Indus Valley around that time.

Artifacts

Several Indus seals with Harappan script have been found in Mesopotamia, particularly in Ur, Babylon and Kish. Still, the archeological record for the existence of the trade with the Indus civilization in Mesopotamia is meager. According to Andrew Robinson:

Animal figurines
Various figurines of exotic animals in gold or carnelian are thought to have been imported from Meluhha. Many such statuettes have been found in Mesopotamian excavations. The carnelian statuette of an Asian monkey was found in the excavation of the Acropolis of Susa, and dated to circa 2340–2100 BCE. It is thought that it may have been imported from India. It is now in the Louvre Museum, reference Sb5884.

Maritime materials trade
Specific items of high volume trade are timber and specialty wood such as ebony, for which large ships were used. Luxury items also appear, such as lapis lazuli mined at a Harappan colony at Shortugai (modern Badakhshan in northern Afghanistan). In the 1980s, important archaeological discoveries were made at Ras al-Jinz (Oman), located at the easternmost point of the Arabian Peninsula, demonstrating maritime Indus Valley connections with Oman, and the Middle East in general.

Conflict with the Akkadians and Neo-Sumerians

According to some accounts of the Akkadian Empire ruler Rimush, he fought against the troops of Meluhha, in the area of Elam:

Gudea too, in one of his inscriptions, mentioned his victory over the territories of Magan, Meluhha, Elam and Amurru.

Identification with the Indus Valley
Most scholars suggest that Meluhha was the Sumerian name for the Indus Valley civilisation. Finnish scholars Asko and Simo Parpola identify Meluhha (earlier variant Me-lah-ha) from earlier Sumerian documents with Dravidian mel akam "high abode" or "high country". Many items of trade such as wood, minerals, and gemstones were indeed extracted from the hilly regions near the Indus settlements. They further claim that Meluhha is the origin of the Sanskrit mleccha, meaning "barbarian, foreigner".

Early texts, such as the Rimush inscription describing combat against Meluhha troops in the area of Elam circa 2200 BC, seem to indicate that Meluhha is to the east, suggesting either the Indus valley or India. However, much later texts, such as the Rassam cylinder documenting the military exploits of King Assurbanipal of Assyria (668–627 BC), long after the Indus Valley civilization had ceased to exist, seem to imply that Meluhha is to be found in Africa, in the area of Egypt.

There is sufficient archaeological evidence for the trade between Mesopotamia and the Indian subcontinent. Impressions of clay seals from the Indus Valley city of Harappa were evidently used to seal bundles of merchandise, as clay seal impressions with cord or sack marks on the reverse side testify. A number of these Indian seals have been found at Ur and other Mesopotamian sites.

The Persian-Gulf style of circular stamped rather than rolled seals, also known from Dilmun, that appear at Lothal in Gujarat, India, and Failaka Island (Kuwait), as well as in Mesopotamia, are convincing corroboration of the long-distance sea trade network, which G.L. Possehl has called a "Middle Asian Interaction Sphere". What the commerce consisted of is less sure: timber and precious woods, ivory, lapis lazuli, gold, and luxury goods such as carnelian and glazed stone beads, pearls from the Persian Gulf, and shell and bone inlays, were among the goods sent to Mesopotamia in exchange for silver, tin, woolen textiles, perhaps oil and grains and other foods. Copper ingots, certainly, bitumen, which occurred naturally in Mesopotamia, may have been exchanged for cotton textiles and chickens, major products of the Indus region that are not native to Mesopotamia—all these have been instanced.

"Meluhha" as Meroe, in the 7th-2nd centuries BCE

In the Assyrian and Hellenistic eras, cuneiform texts continued to use (or revive) old place names, giving a perhaps artificial sense of continuity between contemporary events and events of the distant past.  For example, Media is referred to as "the land of the Gutians", a people who had been prominent around 2000 BC.

Meluhha also appears in these texts, in contexts suggesting that "Meluhha" and "Magan" were kingdoms adjacent to Egypt. In the Rassam cylinder, Ashurbanipal writes about his first march against Egypt: "In my first campaign I marched against Magan and Meluhha, and Taharqa, king of Muṣur (Egypt)  and Kûsu ("Kingdom of Kush", ie Nubia), whom Esarhaddon, king of Assyria, the father who begot me, had defeated, and whose land he brought under his sway." In this context, "Magan" has been interpreted as "Muṣur" (ancient name of Egypt) and "Meluhha" as "Meroe" (capital of Nubia).

In the Hellenistic period, the term was used archaically to refer to Ptolemaic Egypt, as in an account of a festival celebrating the conclusion of the Sixth Syrian War, or in reference to the campaigns of Antiochus IV Epiphanes in Egypt ("Antiochus the King marched triumphantly through the cities of Meluhha").

These references do not necessarily mean that early references to Meluhha also referred to Egypt. Direct contacts between Sumer and the Indus Valley had ceased even during the Mature Harappan phase when Oman and Bahrain (Magan and Dilmun) became intermediaries. After the sack of Ur by the Elamites and subsequent invasions in Sumer, its trade and contacts shifted west and Meluhha passed almost into mythological memory. The resurfacing of the name could simply reflect cultural memory of a rich and distant land, its use in records of Achaemenid and Seleucid military expeditions serving to aggrandize those kings. This kind of re-attribution of archaic geographical terms was a regular occurrence during the 1st millennium BCE.

Rulers
 (..)ibra (between 2300 BC – 2200 BC), possibly contemporary to Naram-Sin of Akkad.

See also

 Buddhism and the Roman world
 Dilmun
 Economic history of India
 Indus–Mesopotamia relations
 Indo-Roman trade relations
 Magan (civilization)

References

Bibliography

External links
Meluhha and Agastya: Alpha and Omega of the Indus Script by Iravatham Mahadevan

Sumer
Bronze Age Asia
Ancient peoples of India
Ancient peoples of Pakistan
Prehistoric India
Indus Valley civilisation
Archaeology of India
Archaeology in Pakistan
Indian Ocean trade